Ectenessini is a tribe of beetles in the subfamily Cerambycinae, containing the following genera:

 Acanthonessa
 Bomarion
 Cotynessa
 Ectenessa
 Ectenesseca
 Ectenessidia
 Eurymerus
 Lissoeme
 Meryeurus
 Niophis
 Paralissoeme
 Tricheurymerus

References

 
Cerambycinae